Tremlett may refer to:

Chris Tremlett (born 1981), former England cricketer
Tim Tremlett (born 1956), former English county cricketer and father of Chris Tremlett
Maurice Tremlett (1923–1984), former England cricketer and father of Tim Tremlett
Thomas Tremlett (1834–1894), English cricketer and lawyer
Giles Tremlett, journalist and author
Tony Tremlett (bishop), former Bishop of Dover
Tony Tremlett (priest), former archdeacon
Andrew Tremlett, Church of England priest
Henry Martyn Tremlett, Lieutenant-colonel in the American Civil War
Rex Tremlett, former miner and writer
David Tremlett, artist and sculptor
George Tremlett, former politician